Laminated dough is a culinary preparation consisting of many thin layers of dough separated by butter, produced by repeated folding and rolling. Such doughs may contain more than eighty layers. During baking, water in the butter vaporizes and expands, causing the dough to puff up and separate, while the lipids in the butter essentially fry the dough, resulting in a light, flaky product. 

Pastries using laminated doughs include:
Croissant pastry
Danish pastry
Flaky pastry
Jachnun
Kouign-amann
Kubaneh
Malawach
Paratha
M'semen
Puff pastry

See also

Dough sheeting, an industrial preparation technique
Filo pastry, used in applications such as baklava, strudel, and spanakopita, where the dough itself is not laminated

References

Baking
Doughs
Food preparation techniques